Henry George Ley   (30 December 188724 August 1962) was an English organist, composer and music teacher.

Early life and education
Born in Chagford, Devon, Ley was the son of the Rev. Gerald Lewis Henry Ley and Beatrice Emma Hayter-Hames. His father, his maternal grandfather and several other maternal relatives served as Rector of Chagford.

Ley was a chorister at St George's Chapel, Windsor Castle, a music scholar at Uppingham School and in 1906 became an organ scholar at Keble College, Oxford. In 1908 he was president of the University Musical Club, and later he was an exhibitioner at the Royal College of Music, where he was a pupil of Sir Walter Parratt and Marmaduke Barton.

His younger brother John William Ley was killed in 1917 during the First World War, at the age of 19.

Career
Ley served as organist at St Mary’s, Farnham Royal, from 1905 to 1906 and at Christ Church Cathedral, Oxford, from 1909 to 1926.

He became a professor of organ at the Royal College of Music in 1919 and was precentor of Radley College and Eton College, in charge of the chapel music, from 1926 to 1945. He was an Honorary Fellow of Keble College from 1926 to 1945.

He died at Feniton in Devon in on 24 August 1962.

Works
Ley composed a number of choral works in the Anglican tradition, including anthems and chant settings. He also composed a setting of the Prayer of King Henry VI, also known as the Founder's Prayer.

References

External links
 

1887 births
1962 deaths
English classical organists
British male organists
People from the Borough of West Devon
English classical composers
20th-century classical composers
Alumni of Keble College, Oxford
Composers for pipe organ
Cathedral organists
Classical composers of church music
English Christians
Alumni of the Royal College of Music
Fellows of the Royal College of Organists
Musicians from Devon
English male classical composers
20th-century English composers
20th-century organists
20th-century British male musicians
Male classical organists